The International Emmy Directorate Award is presented by the International Academy of Television Arts and Sciences and honors individuals or organizations for their outstanding contribution to international television. The award ceremony has taken place annually in New York City since 1973.

Winners 
1973 – Charles Curran (president, European Broadcasting Union / director general, BBC)
1974 – Joseph V. Charyk (president, COMSAT)
1975 – Junzo Imamichi (president, Asia-Pacific Broadcasting Union)
1976 – Talbot S. Duckmanton (chairman of the board, Tokyo Broadcasting System)
Howard Thomas (chairman of the board, Thames Television)
Roberto Marinho (president, Rede Globo)
1977 – Alphonse Quimet (chairman, Telesat / Canadian TV)
1978 – Prix Italia
1979 – Frank Stanton (president emeritus, CBS, Incorporated)
1980 – Lord Grade of Elstree (chairman of the board, Associated Communications Corp.)
1981 – Sir Huw Wheldon (retired (1976) managing director of BBC)
1982 – Akio Morita (chairman and CEO, Sony Corporation)
1983 – Roberto Marinho (president, Rede Globo)
1984 – Lord Sydney Bernstein (founder, Granada Television)
1985 – Leonard H. Goldenson (chairman and CEO, American Broadcasting Companies)
1986 – Herbert Schmertz (vice president of public affairs, Mobil Oil Company)
1987 – Jeremy Isaacs (chief executive, Channel 4)
1988 – Vittorio Boni (director, international relations, RAI)
1989 – Ted Turner (chairman of the board / president, Turner Broadcasting System)
1990 – Henrikas Yushkiavitshus	(assistant director-general, UNESCO)
1991 – Henry Becton (president, WGBH-TV)
1992 – Silvio Berlusconi (president, Fininvest Gruppo)
1993 – Andre Rousselet (chairman, Canal Plus)
1994 – Helmut Thoma (managing director, RTL)
1995 – John Birt (director general, BBC)
1996 – Hebert A. Granath (chairman, Disney–ABC Television Group)
1997 – Dieter Stolte (intendant, ZDF)
1998 – Sam Nilsson (president, Sveriges Television)
1999 – Ralph Baruch (founder, Viacom)
2000 – Su-Ming Cheng (CEO China-TV, Taiwan)
2001 – Gustavo Cisneros (chairman, Grupo Cisneros)
2002 – Katsuji Ebisawa (president, NHK)
2003 – Greg Dyke (director general, BBC)
2004 – Herbert Kloiber (managing director, Tele-München Group)
2005 – Charles Allen (chief executive, ITV
2006 – Ronald Lauder (founder and chairman, CME)
2007 – Patrick Le Lay (chairman, TF1 Group)
2008 – Liu Changle (chairman & CEO, Phoenix Television)
2009 – Prof. Markus Schächter	(director general, ZDF)
2010 – Lorne Michaels (creator & executive producer, Saturday Night Live)
2011 – Subhash Chandra (chairman, Zee TV)
2012 – Dr. Kim In-Kyu (president & CEO, KBS / President, ABU)
2013 – Anke Schäferkordt (president, RTL Group)
2014 – Roberto Irineu Marinho (president, Grupo Globo)
2015 –  Richard Plepler (chairman & CEO, HBO)
2016 – Maria Rørbye Rønn (CEO & director general, DR)
2017 – Emilio Azcárraga Jean (CEO & director general, Grupo Televisa)
2018 – Sophie Turner Laing (chief executive officer of Endemol Shine Group)
2019 – Christiane Amanpour (chief international anchor for CNN)
2020 – None
2021 – Thomas Bellut (director general, ZDF)

References

External links
Official website

 
International Emmy Awards